Bulwer-Lytton is a surname, and may refer to:

 Edward Bulwer-Lytton, 1st Baron Lytton (1803–1873), novelist and politician
 Rosina Bulwer Lytton (1802–1882), feminist writer and wife of Edward Bulwer-Lytton
 Robert Bulwer-Lytton, 1st Earl of Lytton (1831–1891), statesman, poet and son of Edward Bulwer-Lytton and Rosina Bulwer Lytton
 Victor Bulwer-Lytton, 2nd Earl of Lytton (1876–1947), politician
 Neville Bulwer-Lytton, 3rd Earl of Lytton (1879–1951), military officer and artist

See also
 Bulwer (disambiguation)
 Bulwer-Lytton Fiction Contest

Compound surnames